John Henry "Harry" Hollingshead (22 September 1915 – 15 April 1998) was an Australian rules footballer who played with Carlton in the VFL during the late 1930s.

A follower, Hollingshead was a premiership player with Carlton in 1938.

References

External links 
 
Harry Hollingshead's profile at Blueseum

1915 births
1998 deaths
Australian rules footballers from Victoria (Australia)
Carlton Football Club players
Carlton Football Club Premiership players
One-time VFL/AFL Premiership players